Splendid Animation is the debut album of the Welsh alternative rock band Tetra Splendour (now People in Planes).
It was recorded at Cardiff's Audio Zone recording studio, with the exception of the track "Pollenfever" which was recorded and mixed at Jacobs Studios, Surrey.

Track listing
 "Landmine" – 5:57
 "Global Village" – 4:05
 "E.T.A." – 3:56
 "Pollenfever" – 4:06
 "Bless My Soul" – 4:02
 "Muriel's Motorhome" – 4:10
 "Mr. Bishi" – 5:23
 "De-Rail" – 3:43
 "C.F.C's" – 4:43
 "In-Flight Manual" – 4:59
 "Black and Grey" – 5:07

Personnel 
 Gareth Jones - vocals, keyboard, guitar, director
 Pete Roberts - lead guitar, backing vocals
 Kris Blight - bass guitar
 John Maloney – drums, percussion
 Jon Astley – mastering
 Steve Davis – engineer, digital editing
 Edward Skinner – violin
 Paul Durrant - producer, mixing
 Lenny Franchi – producer, mixing for the track "Pollenfever"
 Matt Oliver – digital editing, mixing assistant, assistant producer
 Gareth Jones and Pete Roberts wrote all the songs
 Duncan Illing – A&R

References

External links 
People in Planes' Official Site

2002 debut albums
People in Planes albums